Choneplax is a genus of chitons belonging to the family Acanthochitonidae.

The species of this genus are found in Central America and Africa.

Species:

Choneplax indica 
Choneplax lata 
Choneplax littlerorum

References

Chitons